Sirețel is a commune in Iași County, Western Moldavia, Romania. It is composed of five villages: Berezlogi, Humosu, Satu Nou, Slobozia and Sirețel.

References

Communes in Iași County
Localities in Western Moldavia